Round Lake Township is the name of some places in the U.S. state of Minnesota:
Round Lake Township, Becker County, Minnesota
Round Lake Township, Jackson County, Minnesota

See also

 Round Lake Township (disambiguation)

Minnesota township disambiguation pages